The 2019 Chinese Women's Football Championship is the 29th edition of the Chinese Women's Football Championship. Jiangsu Suning are the defending champions. It will be held from 27 February to 13 May 2019.

First round

Group A

Group B

Group C

Group D

Group E

Final round

1st–12th-place play-offs

Group A

Group B

Group C

9th–12th-place play-offs

Quarter-finals

5th–8th-place play-offs

Semi-finals

7th–8th-place play-off

5th–6th-place play-off

3rd–4th-place play-off

Final

13th–16th-place play-offs

Group D

Group E

13th–14th-place play-off

15th–16th-place play-off

17th–18th-place play-off

Notes

References

2019 in Chinese football